James M. Edmunds (August 23, 1810 – December 14, 1879) was a politician from the U.S. state of Michigan.

Biography
Edmunds was born in Niagara County, New York, received a common school and academic education and taught school from 1826 to 1831.

In 1831, he moved to Ypsilanti, Michigan, where he became a merchant.  He took an interest in the schools there and for ten years was an inspector of schools, also holding a number of other local positions.  He was elected as a Whig to the Michigan Senate from Washtenaw County (5th district) 1840-41 and later to the Michigan House of Representatives 1846-47.  In 1847, he was a Whig candidate for Governor of Michigan, losing to Epaphroditus Ransom.  Edmunds was also a delegate to the constitutional convention of 1850 and member 1851.

In 1853 he moved to Detroit, engaged in the lumber business, extending his operations to Saginaw and Tuscola counties.  In 1854, he became a Republican and chaired the Michigan Republican Party from 1855 to 1861.  He was also Comptroller of Detroit during most of those years from 1857 to 1861.  In 1859 he was appointed postmaster of Washington, D.C., and held that position until his death.

In 1861, Edmunds resigned as comptroller when he was appointed by U.S. President Abraham Lincoln, commissioner of the General Land Office of Washington, and held it until 1866.  Edmunds was a member of the Southern Treaty Commission that renegotiated treaties with the Indian Tribes siding with the Confederacy.  After resigning from the land office, he became postmaster of the Senate which he resigned in 1869.
He was also president of the Michigan Soldiers’ Relief Association in Washington, D.C. from its organization in 1861.  He was also president of the National Council of the Union League from 1862 to 1869 and for a number of years published The Republic, a Washington magazine.

Edmunds died at the age of sixty-nine in Washington, D.C.

References

Sources
Political Graveyard

1810 births
1879 deaths
Michigan state senators
Members of the Michigan House of Representatives
Michigan Republicans
Michigan Whigs
General Land Office Commissioners
19th-century American politicians